If I Ever Fall in Love is a song by Shai 1992

If I Ever Fall in Love (album) Shai
"If I Ever Fall In Love", single by The De Castro Sisters Gene De Paul, Don Raye 1955

See also
"If I Ever Fall in Love Again", a song written by Steve Dorff and Gloria Sklerov, and performed by Anne Murray and Kenny Rogers as a duet. 1989
If I Ever Fall In Love (With A Honky Tonk Girl) Faron Young	1970
If I Ever Fall In Love Again, Jesse Boone And The Astros, Boone  	1972
If I Ever Fall In Love Again,	 Peter Greenwell  from The Crooked Mile (musical)	1959
If I Should Ever Fall In Love,	Gladys Knight And The Pips   	1965